Silent Holocaust (sometimes called "another holocaust" or a "second holocaust") has been used with various meanings, and is used by certain  Jewish communal and religious leaders to describe Jewish assimilation (cultural assimilation, religious assimilation) and interfaith marriages between Jews and gentiles. The term contrasts the resulting demographic effects (decrease in the Jewish population) with the Holocaust of Europe's Jews during World War II resulting in the genocide of six million Jews. Communal leaders, such as Rabbi Ephraim Buchwald of the National Jewish Outreach Program, popularized the phrase.

The word silent is meant to evoke a state of shock due to the fact that millions of Jews are freely choosing to leave Judaism. For some, the loss of millions of Jewish coreligionists is deemed serious enough to be called a holocaust (meaning a "wholesale sacrifice or destruction".

Assimilation

Concerned Jewish people sometimes refer to the assimilation of Jews as a type of Holocaust. This is because since World War II, the assimilation of Jews has been the leading cause of the shrinkage of almost all of the Jewish populations which currently reside in Western countries. This shrinkage has been called the Silent Holocaust (in contrast to the genocide which was committed against the Jews during World War II) by communal leaders such as Rabbi Ephraim Buchwald of the National Jewish Outreach Program. Buchwald said in 1992 that the Jewish community would not be recognizable in 25 to 30 years. According to the 2000—2001 National Jewish Population Survey, from 1996, 47% of American Jews married a non-Jew. The NJPS survey claims that higher levels of education are associated with lower levels of intermarriage.

Use not related to Judaism

To anti-abortion activists, the "silent holocaust" refers to the estimated 60,000,000 fetuses that have been aborted in the United States since abortion was legalized in 1973. One activist group, known as the "Survivors of the Abortion Holocaust," feels that everyone has been directly affected by this holocaust because all people have been denied the company of aborted individuals. The members of this group believes that it is their job to "defend the right to life of future generations and end America's genocide."

See also

 Baal teshuva movement – a description of the return of secular Jews to religious Judaism 
 Black genocide – the idea that African Americans have been subjected to genocide 
 Cultural genocide
 Ethnic cleansing
 Genocide denial
 Genocide of indigenous peoples
 Golus nationalism
 Guatemalan genocide
 Holocaust denial
 Holocaust trivialization
 Religious nationalism
 Slow genocide
 White Genocide – regarding the threat of assimilation in the Armenian diaspora
 White genocide conspiracy theory – an antisemitic, white nationalist and white supremacist conspiracy theory

References

Aftermath of the Holocaust
Anti-abortion movement
Anti-Western sentiment
Cultural assimilation
Dysphemisms
Jewish-American history
Nazi analogies
Racism
Right-wing politics
Segregation